Apoptozole is a drug that acts as a potent and selective inhibitor of the heat shock protein Hsp70, and was one of the first compounds developed to act at this target. It induces apoptosis in susceptible cells, and displays anti-cancer, anti-malarial and antiviral activity. The promising results in animal studies makes it likely that either apoptozole or compounds with similar modes of action will be further researched as potential therapeutics in the future.

References 

Antiviral drugs
Trifluoromethyl compounds
Imidazoles
Amides